The 1981 Campeonato Paulista da Primeira Divisão de Futebol Profissional was the 80th season of São Paulo's top professional football league. São Paulo won the championship by the 13th time. Noroeste was relegated.

Championship
The championship would be divided into two rounds, and each round was divided into three phases - Qualifying, in which two teams qualified into the Final phase, Regular, in which six teams qualified into the Final phase, and Final, divided into two groups of four, with the winners of each group qualifying to the Finals. The winners of each round qualified to the Championship Finals.

First round

Qualifying phase
This stage involved twelve teams:  all of the first level teams except for the eight teams that were still participating either in that year's Taça de Ouro or the Taça de Ouro. The twelve teams were divided into two groups of six, in which each team played twice against the teams of its own group. the top two teams of each group qualified to a playoff to determine the two teams that would qualify into that round's final phase.

Group Gold

Group Red

Qualifying phase Finals

|}

Regular phase

Final phase

Group Red

Group Black

First round Finals

|}

Second round

Qualifying phase
This stage, that happened simultaneously with the First round's Final stage, was composed of the twelve teams that had been eliminated in the First round, divided into three groups of four, in which each team played twice against the teams of its own group, with the best team in each group qualifying to the Finals, where the three teams played once against each other, the best two qualifying to the Second round's Final phase.

Group Green

Group Gold

Group Red

Qualifying phase Finals

Regular phase

Final phase

Group White

Group Black

Second round finals

|}

Finals

|}

Aggregate table

Much like in the previous year, the team with the fewest points would be relegated and the team with the second-fewest points would go to a playoff against the runner-up of the Second Level. only the results of the regular phases were counted. as such, Noroeste was relegated and São Bento had to dispute a playoff in neutral ground against XV de Piracicaba.

Relegation Playoffs

|}

References

Campeonato Paulista seasons
Paulista